The German Party was a political party of Germans in the Kingdom of Serbs, Croats and Slovenes. The party was formed in 1922 and participated in elections until it was banned following Yugoslav king Alexander I's dictatorship of January 6, 1929.

Performance by election
1923 - 43,415 votes, 8 of 312 seats
1925 - 45,117 votes, 5 of 315 seats
1927 - 49,849 votes, 6 of 315 seats

See also
 Germany–Yugoslavia relations

Sources
 

Political parties in the Kingdom of Yugoslavia
German diaspora in Europe
German diaspora political parties
Germany–Yugoslavia relations
Political parties established in 1922
Political parties disestablished in 1929
Ethnic organizations based in Yugoslavia
Danube-Swabian people
Banned political parties